Junedin Sado (or Juneidi Sad) is a former Ethiopian Cabinet Minister.

He was educated at Addis Ababa University (Geology), the University of East Anglia (Environmental Sciences), the University of Birmingham and Azusa Pacific University.

Junedin was President of the Oromia Region from 28 October 2001 until 6 October 2005 when he was replaced by Abadula Gemeda. He subsequently was appointed Transport and Communication Minister, which is the office he was holding when Prime Minister Meles Zenawi moved him to the Science and Technology Ministry October 2008. Following the 2010 general election, Junedin was appointed Minister of Civil Service.

In July 2012 his wife, Habiba Mohammed, was arrested with 29 others. Habiba was charged with funnelling money from the Embassy of Saudi Arabia to Islamist terror groups in Ethiopia. In her defense, Junedin claimed that he had approached the Saudi Arabian Embassy privately for money to build a mosque and fulfil the wishes of his late mother. Junedin was subsequently fired from his position on the executive committee of the Oromo Peoples' Democratic Organization in September, and was released from his position as Minister of Civil Service 29 November.

Ethiochannel, a pro-government private newspaper based in Addis Ababa, reported in February 2013 that Junedin Sado fled to Kenya. However, another report stated that he returned to Ethiopia in July and was killed by government agents in Robe. More recently, Junadin is alleged to have entered the United States and accepted asylum. His recent appearance on ESAT TV has verified he is alive and well.

References 

Year of birth missing (living people)
Living people
Presidents of Oromia Region
Addis Ababa University alumni
Alumni of the University of East Anglia
Alumni of the University of Birmingham
Azusa Pacific University alumni
Government ministers of Ethiopia
Oromo Democratic Party politicians
People from Oromia Region
21st-century Ethiopian politicians